Ganochora is a village and a community of the Katerini municipality. Before the 2011 local government reform it was part of the municipality of Katerini, of which it was a municipal district. The 2011 census recorded 799 inhabitants in the village.

History
Ganochora was established by refugees from the cities in Eastern Thrace: Ganos and Chora that settled in the area after the population exchange between Greece and Turkey in 1922.

See also
 List of settlements in the Pieria regional unit

References

Populated places in Pieria (regional unit)